Immanuel Mifsud (born September 12, 1967) is a writer of poetry and prose, born in Paola, Malta. He was for a time involved in research theatre. He has written six collections of short stories, six poetry collections, and also children stories.

In 2011, he became the first Maltese writer to win the European Union Prize for Literature.

In 2014, he was appointed Member of the Order of Merit of the Republic of Malta.

Mifsud became the first Maltese writer to be hosted at the Library of Congress, Washington, D.C., where on February 16, 2017, he gave a reading and was interviewed during a special event. In the same year he was commissioned to write a poem for Commonwealth Day; Mifsud read "The Book" during Commonwealth Day Celebration at Westminster Abbey on March 13.

Mifsud studied at the University of Malta where he was given a doctorate in literature in 2012. He teaches literature and literary theory at the same university.

Prose 
1991: Stejjer ta' Nies Koroh (Stories of Ugly People)
1993: Il-Ktieb tas-Sibt Filgħaxija (Stories for Saturday Night)
1999: Il-Ktieb tal-Maħbubin Midruba (The Book of Maimed Lovers)
2002: L-Istejjer Strambi ta' Sara Sue Sammut (Sara Sue Sammut's Strange Stories)
2005: Kimika (Chemistry)
2006: Happy Weekend (in English)
2008: Stejjer li ma kellhomx jinkitbu (Forbidden Tales)
2010: Fl-Isem tal-Missier (u tal-Iben) (In the Name of the Father (and of the Son))
2014: Jutta Heim
2016: Fid-Dlam tal-Lejl Ħarisna (In the Dark Night We Looked) 
2019: L-Aqwa Żmien

Poetry 
1998: Fid-Dar ta' Clara (At Clara's)
2001: Il-Ktieb tar-Riħ u l-Fjuri (The Book of the Wind and Flowers)
2004: Polska-Slovensko (bilingual, Maltese-English)
2005: km (bilingual, Maltese-English)
2005: Confidential Reports (in English)
2007: Poland Pictures (in English)
2013: Penelopi Tistenna (Penelope Waits)
2016: Ħuta (Fish)
2016: The Play of Waves (in English)
2019: Sagħtejn u Nofs 'il Bogħod mill-Ġenna (Two and a Half Hours Away from Heaven)
2023: Għażiż Ġismi (My Dear Body)

Theatre 
 2013: translated Molière's Don Juan for the first edition of the Valletta International Baroque Festival.
 2014: translated and adapted for stage Nicholas Monsarrat's The Kappillan of Malta. Produced by Stagun Teatrali Malti for the Malta International Arts Festival (2014).
 2015: wrote  Faith, Hope u Charity  for Stagun Teatrali Malti, presented at the Malta International Arts Festival (2015).
 2016: translated Anders Lustgarten's Lampedusa for Unifaun Theatre.
 2016: wrote this year's edition of Il-Qarcilla.

Children's literature 
2004: Stejjer li Kibru fl-Art (Stories Growing on the Ground)
2009: Orqod, qalbi, Orqod (Sleep, my child, Sleep)
2021: Paramm Paramm

Literary awards 
2021: National Literary Award, co-winner, Jien-Noti-Jien (with Toni Sant) 
2016: National Literary Award, winner, Ħuta
2015: National Literary Award, winner, Jutta Heim
2014: National Literary Award, winner, Penelopi Tistenna
2011: European Union Prize for Literature, winner Malta, Fl-Isem tal-Missier (tal-iben)
2008: Premio Strega Europa, shortlist, L-Istejjer Strambi ta' Sara Sue Sammut
2005: National Literary Award, second place, Kimika
2002: National Literary Award, winner, L-Istejjer Strambi ta' Sara Sue Sammut
2001: National Literary Award, second place, Il-Ktieb tar-Riħ u l-Fjuri

References

External links
Immanuel Mifsud's homepage

 Immanuel Mifsud at the Library of Congress, February 2017
 Immanuel Mifsud reading his poem "The Book" at Westminster Abbey, March 2017
 

20th-century Maltese poets
21st-century Maltese poets
Maltese male poets
1967 births
Living people
People from Paola, Malta
English-language writers from Malta
Maltese-language poets
Recipients of the National Book Prize